Emanuel Newton (born February 1, 1984) is a retired American mixed martial artist who competed in Bellator's Light Heavyweight division, where he is a former Bellator Light Heavyweight World Champion. He has also competed for WEC, King of the Cage, International Fight League, and MFC.  He is also a former MFC Light Heavyweight Champion.

Background
Newton was born in Inglewood, California, and grew up in Torrance, California. Growing up, Newton had an interest in swimming, surfing, and lifeguarding. Newton's father had done some boxing and Muay Thai training, but died when Newton was 10 years old. Newton wrestled and played football, as a defensive end at North High School (Torrance, California). Then, six years later, Newton's mother died and Newton lost interest in his schoolwork. His poor grades did not allow him to continue playing football, but he had improved enough by the start of the wrestling season to continue in that sport. After high school, he went to Cerritos College, but began training with former UFC fighter Paul Herrera, who has also trained former UFC Light Heavyweight Champion Tito Ortiz.

Mixed martial arts career

Early career: World Extreme Cagefighting and King of the Cage
Newton started his MMA career in 2003. Despite having lost his first two bouts against Brian Ebersole and Tim McKenzie respectively, he has fought for WEC once on August 20, 2004, against André Mussi, getting then his first victory via unanimous decision after three rounds.

Newton also fought for KOTC, obtaining a draw against the UFC veteran Hector Ramirez and a victory over the WEC veteran Richard Montoya.

After his win over Jeff Quinlan in IFL, Newton celebrated by buying a motorcycle. Unfortunately, Newton was involved in a crash while driving at 152 miles per hour on a highway in California. He was hit by a car and fell onto the pavement at an estimated 140 mph. He had never broken any bones before but had broken his arm from this accident. He had to have five surgeries on his arm, and developed a staph infection. The infection was so bad that he was in danger of having the arm amputated. Fortunately, the infection died down but Newton received a space between two of the bones in his arm.

Maximum Fighting Championship title and Shark Fights
With a record of 10–3–1, Newton signed with MFC.

Newton faced former UFC fighter David Heath on his debut for the title shot of the Light Heavyweight division. He won via submission in the second round.

Newton faced Roger Hollett for the title on December 5, 2008, at MFC 19. He won via unanimous decision and became the new MFC Light Heavyweight Champion.

Newton faced Trevor Prangley on May 15, 2009, at MFC 21. He lost his title via unanimous decision.

Newton also faced Ryan Jimmo, Dwayne Lewis, and Rodney Wallace on MFC. He lost his bout against Jimmo and won his last two bouts for MFC.

Newton was expected to face Ryan Jimmo again on April 8, 2011, at MFC 29 for the Light Heavyweight Championship. However, he was replaced by Zak Cummings due to injury.

On his two bouts for Shark Fights, he defeated Ilir Latifi and Ricky Shivers. In late 2011 he defeated UFC and K-1 veteran James McSweeney for Superior Cage Combat and closing a sequence of five consecutive victories, he signed with Bellator.

Bellator MMA
Newton made his debut on June 22, 2012, at Bellator 71 against Roy Boughton in the quarterfinal match of
Bellator 2012 Summer Series Light Heavyweight Tournament. He won via submission in the second round and advanced to the semifinals.

On July 20, 2012, at Bellator 72 in the semifinals of the tournament he faced Attila Végh. He lost via split decision.

Newton faced Atanas Djambazov on January 17, 2013, at Bellator 85 in the quarterfinal match of Bellator Season Eight Light Heavyweight Tournament. He won via submission in the second round and advanced to the semifinals.

In the semifinals, Newton defeated former Strikeforce Light Heavyweight Champion Muhammed Lawal on February 21, 2013, at Bellator 90 via KO due to a spinning back fist.

In the finals at Bellator 94, Newton faced Mikhail Zayats and won via unanimous decision.

He was expected to face Bellator Light Heavyweight Champion Attila Végh on November 2, 2013, at Bellator 106. However, due to Vegh getting injured, Newton instead had a rematch against Muhammed Lawal for the Bellator Interim Light Heavyweight Championship. He won the fight via unanimous decision to become the Interim Bellator Light Heavyweight Champion.

Newton faced current Bellator Light Heavyweight Champion Attila Végh at Bellator 113 for a title unification bout on March 21, 2014. He won the fight via split decision to become the current unified Bellator Light Heavyweight Champion.

Newton made his first title defense against Joey Beltran on September 12, 2014, at Bellator 124. He won the fight in the third round due to a spinning back fist, the second time he has landed in his Bellator career.

Newton next faced Linton Vassell on October 24, 2014, at Bellator 130. He successfully defended his title, winning via rear naked choke submission in the fifth round.

For the third defense of his title, Newton faced Liam McGeary on February 27, 2015, in the main event at Bellator 134. He lost the back-and-forth fight via unanimous decision, during the course of the fight, Newton was nearly submitted in the first and third rounds with two triangle chokes, even being rocked at one point in the fourth round. Days after the fight, it was revealed that Newton had tested positive for Marijuana and was subsequently issued a three-month suspension by the Mohegan Tribe Department of Athletic Regulations.

Newton was a participant in Bellator's one-night Light Heavyweight tournament at Bellator MMA & Glory: Dynamite 1 on September 19, 2015.  He faced Phil Davis in the opening round and lost via submission.

Newton had a rematch with Linton Vassell on February 19, 2016, at Bellator 149. He lost the fight via unanimous decision.

On October 5, 2016, Newton was released from Bellator.

Post-Bellator
Newton faced UFC veteran Nikita Krylov on October 13, 2017, at Fight Nights Global 77. He lost the fight via knockout in the first round.

Championships and accomplishments
Bellator Fighting Championships
Bellator Light Heavyweight World Championship (One time; former)
Two successful title defenses
Interim Bellator Light Heavyweight Championship (One time)
Bellator Season Eight Light Heavyweight Tournament Winner
Tied (with Phil Davis and Liam McGeary) for most bouts in Bellator Light Heavyweight division (12)
Maximum Fighting Championship
MFC Light Heavyweight Championship (One time)
Gladiator Challenge
GC Light Heavyweight Championship (One time)

Mixed martial arts record

|-
|Loss
|align=center|26–13–1
|Nikita Krylov
|KO (knee)
|Fight Nights Global 77: Krylov vs. Newton
|
|align=center|1
|align=center|0:43
|Surgut, Russia
|
|-
|Loss
|align=center| 26–12–1
|Artur Astakhov
|Decision (unanimous)
|Fight Nights Global 61: Aleksakhin vs. Enomoto
|
|align=center|3
|align=center|5:00
|Bryansk, Russia
|
|-
|Loss
|align=center| 26–11–1
|Evgeny Erokhin
|Decision (unanimous)
|League S-70: Plotforma 7th
|
|align=center|3
|align=center|5:00
|Sochi, Krasnodar, Russia
|
|-
|Win
|align=center| 26–10–1
|Matt Baker
|Submission (arm-triangle choke)
| Fight Night 2: Medicine Hat
|
|align=center|2
|align=center|3:04
| Medicine Hat, Alberta, Canada
|
|-
|Loss
|align=center| 25–10–1
|Linton Vassell
|Decision (unanimous)
|Bellator 149
|
|align=center|3
|align=center|5:00
|Houston, Texas, United States
|
|-
| Loss
| align=center| 25–9–1
| Phil Davis
| Submission (kimura)
| Bellator 142: Dynamite 1
| 
| align=center| 1
| align=center| 4:39
| San Jose, California, United States
| 
|-
| Loss
| align=center| 25–8–1
| Liam McGeary
| Decision (unanimous)
| Bellator 134
| 
| align=center| 5
| align=center| 5:00
| Uncasville, Connecticut, United States
| 
|-
| Win
| align=center| 25–7–1
| Linton Vassell
| Submission (rear-naked choke)
| Bellator 130
| 
| align=center| 5
| align=center| 0:47
| Mulvane, Kansas, United States
| 
|-
| Win
| align=center| 24–7–1
| Joey Beltran
| KO (spinning back fist)
| Bellator 124
| 
| align=center| 3
| align=center| 3:07
| Plymouth Township, Michigan, United States
| 
|-
| Win
| align=center| 23–7–1
| Attila Végh
| Decision (split)
| Bellator 113
| 
| align=center| 5
| align=center| 5:00
| Mulvane, Kansas, United States
| 
|-
| Win
| align=center| 22–7–1
| Muhammed Lawal 
| Decision (unanimous)
| Bellator 106
| 
| align=center| 5
| align=center| 5:00
| Long Beach, California, United States
| 
|-
| Win
| align=center| 21–7–1
| Mikhail Zayats 
| Decision (unanimous)
| Bellator 94
| 
| align=center| 3
| align=center| 5:00
| Tampa, Florida, United States
| 
|-
| Win
| align=center| 20–7–1
| Muhammed Lawal 
| KO (spinning back fist)
| Bellator 90
| 
| align=center| 1
| align=center| 2:35
| West Valley City, Utah, United States
| 
|-
| Win
| align=center| 19–7–1
| Atanas Djambazov
| Submission (rear-naked choke)
| Bellator 85
| 
| align=center| 2
| align=center| 2:21
| Irvine, California, United States
| 
|-
| Loss
| align=center| 18–7–1
| Attila Végh
| Decision (split)
| Bellator 72
| 
| align=center| 3
| align=center| 5:00
| Tampa, Florida, United States
| 
|-
| Win
| align=center| 18–6–1
| Roy Boughton
| Submission (rear-naked choke)
| Bellator 71
| 
| align=center| 2
| align=center| 0:49
| Chester, West Virginia, United States
| 
|-
| Win
| align=center| 17–6–1
| James McSweeney
| Submission (rear-naked choke)
| Superior Cage Combat 3
| 
| align=center| 1
| align=center| 4:25
| Las Vegas, Nevada, United States
| 
|-
| Win
| align=center| 16–6–1
| Ricky Shivers
| Decision (unanimous)
| Shark Fights 18
| 
| align=center| 3
| align=center| 5:00
| Sparks, Nevada, United States
| 
|-
| Win
| align=center| 15–6–1
| Ilir Latifi
| Decision (unanimous)
| Shark Fights 17: Horwich vs. Rosholt 2
| 
| align=center| 3
| align=center| 5:00
| Frisco, Texas, United States
| 
|-
| Win
| align=center| 14–6–1
| Rodney Wallace
| Submission (rear-naked choke)
| MFC 28 
| 
| align=center| 2
| align=center| 4:34
| Edmonton, Alberta, Canada
| 
|-
| Win
| align=center| 13–6–1
| Dwayne Lewis
| Decision (unanimous)
| MFC 25 
| 
| align=center| 3
| align=center| 5:00
| Edmonton, Alberta, Canada
| 
|-
| Loss
| align=center| 12–6–1
| Ryan Jimmo
| Decision (unanimous)
| MFC 23
| 
| align=center| 3
| align=center| 5:00
| Enoch, Alberta, Canada
| 
|-
| Loss
| align=center| 12–5–1
| Raphael Davis
| Submission (rear-naked choke)
| Called Out MMA 1
| 
| align=center| 2
| align=center| N/A
| Ontario, California, United States
| 
|-
| Loss
| align=center| 12–4–1
| Trevor Prangley
| Decision (unanimous)
| MFC 21 
| 
| align=center| 5
| align=center| 5:00
| Enoch, Alberta, Canada
| 
|-
| Win
| align=center| 12–3–1
| Roger Hollett
| Decision (unanimous)
| MFC 19: Long Time Coming
| 
| align=center| 5
| align=center| 5:00
| Enoch, Alberta, Canada
| 
|-
| Win
| align=center| 11–3–1
| David Heath
| Submission (rear-naked choke)
| MFC 18: Famous
| 
| align=center| 2
| align=center| 4:42
| Enoch, Alberta, Canada
| 
|-
| Win
| align=center| 10–3–1
| B.J. Lacy
| Submission (rear-naked choke)
| PureCombat 5: Hard Core
| 
| align=center| 2
| align=center| 0:46
| Visalia, California, United States
| 
|-
| Win
| align=center| 9–3–1
| Jeff Quinlan
| Technical Submission (arm-triangle choke)
| IFL: Chicago
| 
| align=center| 1
| align=center| 3:37
| Chicago, Illinois, United States
| 
|-
| Win
| align=center| 8–3–1
| Marcos Rodriguez
| Submission (armbar)
| COF 6: It's On!
| 
| align=center| 2
| align=center| 4:43
| Tijuana, Baja California, Mexico
| 
|-
| Win
| align=center| 7–3–1
| Arthur César Jacintho
| Decision
| GC 59: St. Paddywack
| 
| align=center| 3
| align=center| 5:00
| Sacramento, California, United States
| 
|-
| Win
| align=center| 6–3–1
| Kyacey Uscola
| TKO (punches)
| GC 51: Madness at the Memorial
| 
| align=center| 2
| align=center| 0:50
| Sacramento, California, United States
| 
|-
| Win
| align=center| 5–3–1
| Richard Montoya
| Decision (unanimous)
| KOTC: Heavy Hitters
| 
| align=center| 3
| align=center| 5:00
| Coarsegold, California, United States
| 
|-
| Win
| align=center| 4–3–1
| John Lansing
| TKO (punches)
| KOTC: Outlaws
| 
| align=center| 1
| align=center| 1:04
| Globe, Arizona, United States
| 
|-
| Draw
| align=center| 3–3–1
| Hector Ramirez
| Draw
| KOTC 58: Prime Time
| 
| align=center| 2
| align=center| 5:00
| San Jacinto, California, United States
| 
|-
| Win
| align=center| 3–3
| Nate Ducharme
| Decision
| GC 36: Proving Grounds
| 
| align=center| 2
| align=center| 5:00
| Lakeport, California, United States
| 
|-
| Loss
| align=center| 2–3
| Mike van Arsdale
| Submission (kimura)
| MMA Mexico: Day 1
| 
| align=center| 1
| align=center| 1:35
| Ciudad Juárez, Chihuahua, Mexico
| 
|-
| Win
| align=center| 2–2
| Bryan Pardoe
| Decision (unanimous)
| Venom: First Strike
| 
| align=center| 2
| align=center| 5:00
| Huntington Beach, California, United States
| 
|-
| Win
| align=center| 1–2
| André Mussi
| Decision (unanimous)
| WEC 11
| 
| align=center| 3
| align=center| 5:00
| Lemoore, California, United States
| 
|-
| Loss
| align=center| 0–2
| Tim McKenzie
| Decision (unanimous)
| Rage on the River
| 
| align=center| 3
| align=center| 3:00
| Redding, California, United States
| 
|-
| Loss
| align=center| 0–1
| Brian Ebersole
| TKO (punches)
| CFM: Ultimate Fighting Mexico
| 
| align=center| 4
| align=center| N/A
| Monterrey, Nuevo León, Mexico
|

See also
 List of Bellator MMA alumni

References

1984 births
African-American Christians
African-American mixed martial artists
American sportspeople in doping cases
Doping cases in mixed martial arts
Living people
American male mixed martial artists
Mixed martial artists from California
Light heavyweight mixed martial artists
Mixed martial artists utilizing wrestling
Sportspeople from Inglewood, California
People from Torrance, California
Bellator MMA champions
21st-century African-American sportspeople
20th-century African-American people